Tharwa may refer to:

The Tharwa Foundation, a nonprofit organization to advance democracy, development, and diversity in the Middle East
Tharwa,  a village 35 kilometres outside Canberra, Australia
Tharwa Primary School, a former school in Tharwa, Australia